The following list is a discography of production by MF DOOM, a British-American hip hop producer and rapper. It includes a list of songs produced, co-produced and remixed by year, album and title.

1999

MF DOOM – Operation: Doomsday 
 01. "The Time We Faced Doom (skit)"
 02. "Doomsday"
 03. "Rhymes Like Dimes" 
 04. "The Finest" 
 05. "Back In The Days (skit)"
 06. "Go With the Flow"
 07. "Tick, Tick..." 
 08. "Red And Gold" 
 10. "Who You Think I Am?" 
 11. "Doom, Are You Awake? (skit)"
 12. "Hey!"
 13. "Operation: Greenbacks" 
 14. "The Mic"
 15. "The Mystery of Doom (skit)"
 16. "Dead Bent"
 17. "Gas Drawls"
 18. "?" 
 19. "Hero vs. Villain (Epilogue)"

2000

MF DOOM and MF Grimm – MF EP 
 02. "No Snakes Alive" 
 03. "Impostas"

2002

MF Grimm – The Downfall of Ibliys: A Ghetto Opera 
01. "Alpha" 
03. "Life And Death"
04. "Freedom" 
05. "Foolish" 
08. "Rain Blood" 
09. "Voices Pt. 0"
10. "Voices Pt. 1" 
12. "I.B.'s"
13. "To All My Comrades"
14. "Howl"

2003

Monsta Island Czars – Escape from Monsta Island! 
05. 1,2... 1,2 
06. Scientific Civilization (skit)
07. MIC Line 
14. Make It Squash 
18. Comin' at You 
20. Escape From Monsta Isle

King Geedorah – Take Me to Your Leader 
1. "Fazers" 
2. "Fastlane" 
3. "Krazy World" 
4. "The Final Hour" 
5. "Monster Zero"
6. "Next Levels" 
7. "No Snakes Alive" 
8. "Anti-Matter" 
9. "Take Me to Your Leader"
10. "Lockjaw" 
11. "I Wonder" 
12. "One Smart Nigger"
13. "The Fine Print"

2004

Madvillain – Madvillainy
 01. "The Illest Villains"

MF DOOM – Mm..Food
 01. "Beef Rapp"
 02. "Hoe Cakes"
 05. "Deep Fried Frenz"
 06. "Poo-Putt Platter"
 07. "Fillet-O-Rapper"
 08. "Gumbo"
 09. "Fig Leaf Bi-Carbonate"
 10. "Kon Karne"
 11. "Guinnesses" 
 13. "Rapp Snitch Knishes" 
 14. "Vomitspit"
 15. "Kookies"

2006

Ghostface Killah – Fishscale
 06. "9 Milli Bros." 
 15. "Clipse of Doom" 
 16. "Jellyfish" 
 21. "Underwater"

Masta Killa – Made in Brooklyn
 02. "E.N.Y. House"

Ghostface Killah – More Fish
 03. "Guns N' Razors" 
 15. "Alex (Stolen Script)"

2007

Hell Razah – Renaissance Child
 04. "Project Jazz"

2008

John Robinson – Who is this Man?
01."Intro / Outside Perspective"
02. "Indy 102"
03. "There She Goes" 
04. "Shrink Rap"
05. "Invisible Man" 
06. "Rapsploitation"
07. "Black Gold"
08. "Expressions" 
09. ""Outta Control"
10. "Crazy Music" 
11. "The Truth" 
12. "The Replenish"
13. "Sorcerers"

2009

MF DOOM – Born Like This
01. "Supervillain Intro"
04. "Yessir" 
08. "Batty Boyz"
09. "Angelz" 
10. "Cellz"
11. "Still Dope" 
14. "That's That"
15. "Supervillainz" 
16. "Bumpy's Message" 
17. "Thank Yah"

Tyler, the Creator - Bastard
03. "Odd Toddlers"

2010

TiRon – MSTRD
04. "Ms. Right" 
05. "Boys & Girls"

Earl Sweatshirt - EARL
09. "Deerskin"

2012

Capital STEEZ – AmeriKKKan Korruption
06. "Dead on Arrival"
14. "Chicago"

Joey Badass – 1999
07. "World Domination"
08. "Pennyroyal"

Bishop Nehru – Nehruvia
04. "Lemon Grass"
13. "Elder Blossoms"

Masta Ace – MA DOOM: Son of Yvonne
01. "D Ski's Intro"
02. "Nineteen Seventy Something"
03. "Son of Yvonne"
04. "Da'Pro"
05. "Store Frontin'"
06. "Me and My Gang"
07. "Crush Hour"
08. "Think I Am"
09. "Fresh Fest"
10. "Hoe-Tel Leftovers"
11. "Slow Down"
12. "Home Sweet Home"
13. "Dedication"
14. "I Did It"
15. "In da Spot"
16. "Outtakes"

2013

Joey Bada$$ – Summer Knights
13. "Amethyst Rockstar"

2014

Bishop Nehru & MF DOOM – NehruvianDOOM
01. "Intro"
02. "Om"
03. "Mean the Most"
04. "So Alone"
05. "Coming for You"
06. "Darkness (HBU)"
07. "Caskets"
08. "Great Things"
09. "Disastrous"

2020

Bishop Nehru — Nehruvia: My Disregarded Thoughts
"Meathead"

References 

Hip hop discographies
Discographies of British artists
Production discographies